Berit Kristensen (born 2 August 1983 in Sakskøbing) is a former Danish team handball player, who played for the club Randers HK and for the Danish women's national handball team.

At the 2010 European Women's Handball Championship she reached the bronze final and placed fourth with the Danish team.

References

External links
 Profile on Randers HK official website

1983 births
Living people
Danish female handball players
Handball players at the 2012 Summer Olympics
Olympic handball players of Denmark
People from Guldborgsund Municipality
Sportspeople from Region Zealand